A treadle bicycle is a bicycle powered by a treadle instead of the more common crank. Treadles were one of the mechanisms inventors tried in order to position the pedals away from the drive wheel hub before the development of the bicycle chain or instead of it. Treadles have also been used to drive tricycles and quadracycles.

History
Treadles were used before the advent of highwheelers on Thomas McCall's velocipede, on highwheelers themselves in an attempt to address safety issues, on alternative configurations of highwheelers, and on the first device called a safety bicycle by British engineer Henry J. Lawson in 1876. Some inventors even combined treadles and chains on the same bicycle.

Gallery

See also
 Outline of cycling
 Types of bicycles

References

Bicycles
Cycle types